Native rosella may refer to certain plant species in the family Malvaceae:

Abelmoschus ficulneus
Hibiscus tiliaceus
Hibiscus heterophyllus, native to New South Wales and Queensland

See also
Rosella (disambiguation)